Judy and Jane was a radio soap opera originally heard on CBS from February 8 to June 17, 1932 and on NBC from October 10, 1932 to April 26, 1935. Sponsored by Folgers Coffee, it was heard regionally in the U.S. Midwest only.

One of the first soap operas on radio, Judy and Jane was extremely popular in the Central Time Zone. Even after the network run ended in 1935, it continued to be distributed through transcription until 1947.

The series was written by Robert Hardy Andrews and produced by Frank and Anne Hummert.

Cast
Judy – Margie Calvert, Joan Kay
Jane – Donna Reade, Betty Ruth Smith, Ireene Wicker and Margaret Evans
Announcer – Jack Brinkley

References

1932 radio programme debuts
1947 radio programme endings
1940s American radio programs
American radio soap operas
CBS Radio programs
NBC radio programs